The Police Station Attacks were a series of guerrilla style attacks by the EOKA on police stations in Cyprus during June 1955 which led to the start of the Cyprus Emergency. The attacks took place:
19 June – dynamite attack at the police station at the Nicosia suburb of Ayios Dhometios;
19 June – bomb set off the central police building at Nicosia
22 June – the police station at Amiandos was attacked by an EOKA guerrilla group led by Renos Kyriakides, resulting in the death of a policeman.

References

Wars involving the United Kingdom
Cyprus Emergency
1955 crimes in Cyprus
Attacks on police stations in the 1950s
20th century in Nicosia
Crime in Nicosia
June 1955 events in Europe
1950s murders in Cyprus